Rosneftegaz is a  Russian holding company managing assets in the oil and gas industry. Rosneftegaz is the owner of a controlling stake in Rosneft, 10.97% of the shares of Gazprom, as well as 26.36% of the shares of Inter RAO.

100% of Rosneftegaz shares are owned by the state represented by the Federal Agency for State Property Management.

References

Rosneft
Companies based in Moscow
Energy companies established in 2004
Government-owned companies of Russia
Holding companies of Russia
Natural gas companies of Russia
Oil companies of Russia
Russian companies established in 2004